The Department of Sport, Recreation and Tourism was an Australian government department that existed between March 1983 and July 1987.

History
The Department was one of three new Departments established by the Hawke Government in March 1983, to ensure the priorities of the Labor Government could be given effect to readily following the federal election of that month.

The Department was dissolved in July 1987 as part of a large overhaul of the Public Service that reduced the number of departments from 28 to 17. Its functions were dispersed between several departments, and the department's Secretary, Bruce MacDonald, was appointed to a senior position in the Data Protection Agency.

Scope
Information about the department's functions and/or government funding allocation could be found in the Administrative Arrangements Orders, the annual Portfolio Budget Statements and in the Department's annual reports.

At its creation, the Department dealt with:
Sport and recreation
Tourism, including the tourist industry.

Structure
The Department was an Australian Public Service department, staffed by officials responsible to the Minister for Sport, Recreation and Tourism, John Brown.

The Secretary of the Department was Bruce MacDonald.

References

Ministries established in 1983
Sport, Recreation and Tourism
1983 establishments in Australia
1987 disestablishments in Australia